A  clootie (also cloutie; from the Scots word cloot or clout: "a piece of cloth or leather; a patch; a rag") is a strip or piece of cloth, a rag or item of clothing, traditionally used to make clootie dumplings. The term clootie can also refer to fabric used in the patching of clothes or the making of clootie mats ( proddy rugs).

Sayings
The saying "Ne'er cast a cloot til mey's oot" conveys a warning not to shed any clothes before summer has arrived and the may-trees and hedges (hawthorn) are in full bloom. The saying also appears in English as "Ne'er cast a clout till May be out".

Food
A traditional pudding called clootie dumpling is made with flour, breadcrumbs, dried fruit (currants, raisins, sultanas), suet, sugar and spices with some milk to bind it, and sometimes golden syrup. Ingredients are mixed well into a dough, then wrapped up in a floured cloth (the clootie), placed in a large pan of boiling water and simmered for a couple of hours before being lifted out and dried near the fire or in an oven. Recipes vary from region to region.

"Clootie dumpling" has also been used as a nickname for the logo of the Scottish National Party.

Place marker
Clootie wells are wells or springs in Celtic areas where pilgrims leave strips of cloth or rags, usually as part of a healing ritual.

Anatomy
A cluit (Anglicised cloot) less commonly refers to the cloven hoof of cattle, sheep or pigs, and from this the term Cluitie is used as a euphemism for the Devil.

See also 

 Poutchine au sac, Métis bag pudding from Western Canada
 Figgy duff (pudding), a bag pudding from Newfoundland

References

Scots language
Scottish clothing
British puddings
Scottish desserts